"Digital" is a song by the band Joy Division, originally released on the 1978 double 7-inch EP entitled A Factory Sample. It was later featured on the 1981 compilation album Still, the 1988 compilation album Substance, and the 1997 box set Heart and Soul.

The track was recorded in the band's first session with Martin Hannett as a producer. Recording took place at Cargo Studios in Rochdale, Lancashire on 11 October 1978.

It was the last song ever performed by Joy Division, as it was the final song of the last gig recorded on 2 May 1980 at Birmingham University, just before the suicide of the band's singer Ian Curtis. The entire concert was released on the Still album in 1981, and is also notable for including one of only three known recordings of Ceremony.

Other media
The song features in the films 24 Hour Party People and Control, where Tony Wilson sees the band play for the first time.

The song was used prominently by the BBC during their coverage of the 2005 Six Nations rugby tournament. Not only was it used in the 2005 Six Nations championships, but it is still used in the BBC's coverage of all international rugby. It is also used for Sky's coverage of the UEFA Champions League.

References

Joy Division songs
Songs written by Bernard Sumner
Songs written by Peter Hook
Songs written by Stephen Morris (musician)
Songs written by Ian Curtis
1978 songs